The 2021 Orange Bowl was a college football bowl game played on January 2, 2021, with kickoff scheduled for 8:00 p.m. EST on ESPN. It was the 87th edition of the Orange Bowl, and was one of the 2020–21 bowl games concluding the 2020 FBS football season. Sponsored by bank holding company Capital One, the game was officially known as the Capital One Orange Bowl.

Teams
As one of the New Year's Six bowl games, the participants of the game were determined by the College Football Playoff selection committee. The committee matched No. 5 Texas A&M of the Southeastern Conference (SEC) against No. 13 North Carolina of the Atlantic Coast Conference (ACC). The programs had not previously met.

Texas A&M Aggies

Texas A&M entered the bowl with an 8–1 record, all in SEC games. Their only loss of the season was to Alabama, a 52–24 defeat. The Aggies defeated one ranked team during the season, Florida, by a score of 41–38. Texas A&M had appeared in one previous Orange Bowl, the 1944 edition.

North Carolina Tar Heels

North Carolina entered the bowl with an 8–3 record, 7–3 in ACC play. The Tar Heels' losses were to Florida State, Virginia, and ranked Notre Dame. North Carolina defeated three ranked teams during the season: Virginia Tech, NC State, and Miami (FL). This was the first appearance by the Tar Heels in an Orange Bowl.

Game summary

Statistics

See also
 2021 College Football Playoff National Championship, played at the same venue nine days later

Notes

References

External links

Game statistics at statbroadcast.com

Orange Bowl
Orange Bowl
Orange Bowl
Orange Bowl
North Carolina Tar Heels football bowl games
Texas A&M Aggies football bowl games